Brian Murphy (born 7 April 1973) is a Jamaican cricketer. He played in 34 first-class and 12 List A matches for the Jamaican cricket team from 1993 to 2002.

See also
 List of Jamaican representative cricketers

References

External links
 

1973 births
Living people
Jamaican cricketers
Jamaica cricketers
Place of birth missing (living people)